Lysimachia thyrsiflora, the tufted loosestrife, is a plant in the genus Lysimachia. It is native to large sections of the northern Northern Hemisphere, including Eurasia and North America. It often grows in marshes, shorelines of lakes and ponds and occasionally along streams. It is an erect perennial herb growing up to 80 centimeters tall and bearing yellow flowers, sometimes dotted with purple. It may be confused with purple loosestrife when not blooming but can be easily distinguished because purple loosestrife has a square stem. Tufted loosestrife has been used medicinally in Asia to combat high blood pressure.

It is a rare species in Britain, where it is found in Salix cinerea - Galium palustre wet woodland (community W1 of the British National Vegetation Classification system), Salix pentandra - Carex rostrata wet woodland (NVC community W3) and Carex rostrata - Sphagnum recurvum mire (community M4).

References

External links

 Jepson Manual Treatment
 
 

thyrsiflora
Flora of Europe
Flora of temperate Asia
Flora of Canada
Flora of the United States
Flora of Alaska
Plants described in 1753
Taxa named by Carl Linnaeus
Flora without expected TNC conservation status